Corneroporus is a fungal genus in the family Bankeraceae. It is monotypic, containing the single species Corneroporus subcitrinus, found in Malaysia. This fungus was originally described in the genus Boletopsis by mycologist E. J. H. Corner in 1989.

References

External links
 

Monotypic Basidiomycota genera
Thelephorales
Fungi of Malaysia